Dolly Vardens was a  recurring name used for a number of baseball teams throughout the United States in the early decades of base ball (1860s-1880s). Most were white, male squads, though there was an all-female, African-American team from Chester PA, assembled by barber-turned-sports entrepreneur John Lang in the 1880s. However, the latter team was considered a novelty, rather than a competitive organization, who played for the entertainment of spectators. (MLB official historian John Thorn notes, "Lang’s Dolly Vardens, created in the 1880s, are sometimes confused with several Philadelphia-area all-male clubs bearing that name as early as 1867.")

The name was taken from a character in the 1841 novel Barnaby Rudge, by Charles Dickens.

See also
 Women in baseball

References 

Baseball in Philadelphia
Defunct baseball teams in Pennsylvania
Baseball teams established in 1867
Baseball teams disestablished in 1887
Women's baseball teams in the United States
Women's sports in Pennsylvania